This is the order of battle for German Wehrmacht and the Soviet Red Army engaged in the battle in Berlin. The investment of Berlin began about 21 April 1945, it was followed by the assault and the capture of the city by the Soviets on 2 May 1945.

German forces

LVI Panzer Corps
Panzer Division Müncheberg
9.Fallschirmjäger-Division
18. Panzer-Grenadier-Division
20. Panzer-Grenadier-Division
Kampfgruppe Mohnke (2000 soldiers)
Begleit-Bataillon Reichsführer-SS (600 soldiers)
Führer-Begleit-Kompanie
ϟϟ-Einsatz “Ezquerra” (Spanish) (100-150 soldiers)
33. Waffen-Grenadier-Division der SS „Charlemagne“ ( 120-300 soldiers)
1. SS-Panzer-Division „Leibstandarte Adolf Hitler“ ( 600 soldiers)
LSSAH Ausbildungs-und Ersatz Battalion
15. Waffen-Grenadier-Division der SS ( company)
11. SS-Freiwilligen-Panzergrenadier-Division „Nordland“
Schwere SS-Panzer-Abteilung 503
1. Flak-Division
Wachbattailon Grossdeutschland
Transport-Begleit-Bataillon der Luftwaffe 1/III
Wach-Bataillon "Hermann Goring"
Polizei-Regiment Biesenthal 
 Volkssturm
SS-Standarte 6
HJ-Abteilung "Herbert Norkus"
SA Brigade 28 "Horst Wessel" (Berlin-Ost)
SA-Bataillon "Horst Wessel" 
SA-Abteilung "Wilhelm Gustloff"
SA-Brigade 29 (Berlin-Nord)
SA-Brigade 30 (Berlin-West)
SA-Brigade 31 (Berlin-Süd)
SA-Brigade 32 (Berlin-Mitte)
Panzerjagdverband „Adolf Hitler"
Bataillon 3/115 (Siemensstadt)

Soviet forces

1st Belorussian Front 

 1st Belorussian Front
 47th Army
 125th Rifle Corps
 175th Rifle Division
 76th Rifle Division
 185th Rifle Division
 60th Rifle Division
 129th Rifle Corps
 146th Rifle Division
 82nd Rifle Division
 132nd Rifle Division
 70th Independent Guard Heavy Tank Regiment
 334th Guards Heavy Self-propelled Artillery Regiment
 1204th Self-propelled Artillery Regiment
 1416th Self-propelled Artillery Regiment
 1892nd Self-propelled Artillery Regiment
 6th Breakthrough Artillery Division
 2nd Mortar Brigade
 10th Cannon Artillery Brigade
 18th Howitzer Artillery Brigade
 21st Light Artillery Brigade
 118th Heavy Howitzer Artillery Brigade
 124th Howitzer Artillery Brigade
 4th Corps Artillery Brigade
 74th Anti-Aircraft Artillery Division
 18th Engineer Brigade
 3rd Shock Army
 79th Rifle Corps
 150th Rifle Division
 171st Rifle Division
 207th Rifle Division
 12th Guards Rifle Corps
 23rd Guards Rifle Division
 33rd Rifle Division
 52nd Guards Rifle Division
 7th Rifle Corps
 146th Rifle Division
 265th Rifle Division
 364th Rifle Division
 38th Rifle Corps
 52nd Rifle Division
 64th Rifle Division
 89th Rifle Division
 9th Tank Corps
 23rd Tank Brigade
 95th Tank Brigade
 108th Tank Brigade
 8th Motorised Rifle Brigade
 85th Independent Tank Regiment
 88th Independent Guards Heavy Tank Regiment
 351st Guards Heavy Self-propelled Artillery Regiment
 1049th Self-propelled Artillery Regiment
 1203rd Self-propelled Artillery Regiment
 1455th Self-propelled Artillery Regiment
 1508th Self-propelled Artillery Regiment
 1728th Self-propelled Artillery Regiment
 1729th Self-propelled Artillery regiment
 1818th Self-propelled Artillery Regiment
 4th Breakthrough Artillery Corps
 5th Breakthrough Artillery Division
 1st Mortar Brigade
 9th Howitzer Artillery Brigade
 23rd Guards Light Artillery Brigade
 24th Cannon Artillery Brigade
 86th Heavy Howitzer Artillery Brigade
 100th Howitzer Artillery Brigade
 12th Breakthrough Artillery Division
 41st Guards Mortar Brigade
 89th Heavy Howitzer Artillery Brigade
 104th Howitzer Artillery Brigade
 40th Independent Tank Destroyer Artillery Brigade
 45th Tank Destroyer Artillery Brigade
 136th Army Canon Artillery Brigade
 5th Guards Mortar Division
 16th Guards Mortar Brigade
 22nd Guards Mortar Brigade
 23rd Guards Mortar Brigade
 19th Anti-Aircraft Artillery Division
 25th Engineer Brigade
 5th Shock Army
 26th Guards Rifle Corps
 89th Guards Rifle Division
 94th Guards Rifle Division
 266th Rifle Division
 32nd Rifle Corps
 60th Guards Rifle Division
 295th Rifle Division
 416th Rifle Division
 9th Rifle Corps
 230th Rifle Division
 248th Rifle Division
 301st Rifle Division
 11th Tank Corps
 20th Tank Brigade
 36th Tank Brigade
 65th Tank Brigade
 12th Motorised Rifle Brigade
 11th Independent Guards Heavy Tank Brigade
 67th Guards Heavy Tank Brigade
 220th Independent Tank Brigade
 396th Guards Heavy Self-propelled Artillery Regiment
 1504th Independent Self-propelled Artillery Regiment
 6th Breakthrough Artillery Corps
 2nd Breakthrough Artillery Division
 5th Mortar Brigade
 10th Guards Howitzer Artillery Brigade
 16th Guards Canon Artillery Brigade
 20th Light Artillery Brigade
 48th Guards Heavy Howitzer Artillery Brigade
 121st Howitzer Artillery Brigade
 14th Breakthrough Artillery Division
 6th Guards Mortar Brigade
 21st Heavy Mortar Brigade
 24th Mortar Brigade
 122nd Howitzer Artillery Brigade
 169th Light Artillery Brigade
 172nd Howitzer Artillery Brigade
 176th Heavy Howitzer Artillery Brigade
 22nd Breakthrough Artillery Division
 6th Heavy Mortar Brigade
 32nd Mortar Brigade
 97th Heavy Howitzer Brigade
 2nd Guards Mortar Brigade
 25th Guards Mortar Brigade
 35th Guards Mortar Brigade
 2nd Guards Anti-Aircraft Artillery Division
 1st Independent Guards Motorised Engineer Brigade
 17th Breakthrough Engineer Brigade
 61st Engineer Brigade
 8th Guards Army
 4th Guards Rifle Corps
 35th Guards Rifle Division
 47th Guards Rifle Division
 57th Guards Rifle Division
 29th Guards Rifle Corps
 27th Guards Rifle Division
 74th Guards Rifle Division
 82nd Guards Rifle Division
 28th Guards Rifle Corps
 39th Guards Rifle Division
 79th Guards Rifle Division
 88th Guards Rifle Division
 7th Independent Guards Heavy Tank Brigade
 34th Independent Guards Heavy Tank Regiment
 65th Independent Tank Regiment
 259th Independent Tank Regiment
 371st Guards Self-propelled Artillery Regiment
 394th Guards Heavy Self-propelled Artillery Regiment
 694th Self-propelled Artillery Regiment
 1026th Self-propelled Artillery Regiment
 1061st Self-propelled Artillery Regiment
 1087th Self-propelled Artillery Regiment
 1200th Self-propelled Artillery Regiment
 3rd Breakthrough Artillery Corps
 18th Breakthrough Artillery Division
 2nd Heavy Howitzer Artillery Brigade
 42nd Mortar Brigade
 58th Howitzer Artillery Brigade
 65th Light Artillery Brigade
 80th Heavy Howitzer Artillery Brigade
 120th Howitzer Artillery Brigade
 29th Breakthrough Artillery Division
 26th Heavy Mortar Brigade
 36th Guards Mortar Brigade
 46th Mortar Brigade
 182nd Light Artillery Brigade
 184th Howitzer Artillery Brigade
 186th Howitzer Artillery Brigade
 189th Heavy Howitzer Artillery Brigade
 38th Tank Destroyer Artillery Brigade
 43rd Army Guards Canon Artillery Brigade
 2nd Guards Mortar Division
 17th Guards Mortar Brigade
 20th Guards Mortar Brigade
 26th Guards Mortar Brigade
 3rd Guards Anti-Aircraft Artillery Division
 2nd Breakthrough Engineer Brigade
 7th Pontoon Bridge Brigade
 64th Engineer Brigade
 1st Guards Tank Army
 11th Guards Tank Corps
 40th Guards Tank Brigade
 44th Guards Tank Brigade
 45th Guards Tank Brigade
 27th Guards Motorised Rifle Brigade
 8th Guards Mechanised Corps
 19th Guards Mechanized Brigade
 20th Guards Mechanised Brigade
 21st Guards Mechanised Brigade
 1st Guards Tank Brigade
 64th Independent Guards Tank Brigade
 19th Self-propelled Artillery Brigade
 11th Independent Guards Heavy Tank Regiment
 48th Independent Guards Heavy Tank Regiment
 353rd Guards Self-propelled Artillery Regiment
 362nd Guards Heavy Self-propelled Artillery Regiment
 399th Guards Heavy Self-propelled Artillery Regiment
 400th Guards Self-propelled Artillery Regiment
 1454th Self-propelled Artillery Regiment
 25th Independent Tank Destroyer Artillery Brigade
 41st Tank Destroyer Artillery Brigade
 197th Light Artillery Brigade
 4th Guards Anti-Aircraft Artillery Division
 6th Pontoon Bridge Brigade
 17th Motorised Engineer Brigade
 2nd Guards Tank Army
 12th Guards Tank Corps
 48th Guards Tank Brigade
 49th Guards Tank Brigade
 34th Guards Motorised Rifle Division
 1st Polish Infantry Division (*)
 1st Mechanised Corps
 19th Mechanised Brigade
 35th Mechanised Brigade
 37th Mechanised Brigade
 219th Tank Brigade
 33rd Guards Motorised Rifle Brigade
 9th Guards Tank Corps
 6th Independent Guards Heavy Tank Regiment
 79th Independent Guards Heavy Tank Regiment
 75th Self-propelled Artillery Regiment
 347th Guards Heavy Self-propelled Artillery Regiment
 393rd Guards Self-propelled Artillery Regiment
 2nd Polish Howitzer Artillery Brigade (*)
 20th Tank Destroyer Artillery Brigade
 198th Light Artillery Brigade
 24th Anti-aircraft Artillery Division
 18th Motorised Engineer Brigade
 16th Air Army
 1st Guards Fighter Aviation Corps
 3rd Guards Fighter Aviation Division
 4th Guards Fighter Aviation Division
 3rd Fighter Aviation Corps
 265th Fighter Aviation Division
 278th Fighter Aviation Division
 3rd Bomber Aviation Corps
 241st Bomber Aviation Division
 301st Bomber Aviation Division
 183rd Bomber Aviation Division
 6th Bomber Aviation Corps
 113th Bomber Aviation Division
 326th Bomber Aviation Division
 6th Assault Aviation Corps
 197th Assault Aviation Division
 198th Assault Aviation Division
 6th Fighter Aviation Corps
 234th Fighter Aviation Division
 273rd Fighter Aviation Division
 9th Assault Aviation Corps
 3rd Guards Assault Aviation Division
 300th Assault Aviation Division
 13th Fighter Aviation Corps
 193rd Fighter Aviation Division
 283rd Fighter Aviation Division
 1st Guards Fighter Aviation Division
 2nd Guards Assault Aviation Division
 9th Guards Night Bomber Aviation Division
 11th Guards Assault Aviation Division
 188th Bomber Aviation Division
 221st Bomber Aviation Division
 242nd Night Bomber Aviation Division
 282nd Fighter Aviation Division
 286th Fighter Aviation Division

1st Ukrainian Front 

 1st Ukrainian Front
 28th Army
 20th Rifle Corps
 20th Rifle Division
 48th Guards Rifle Division
 55th Guards Rifle Division
 128th Rifle Corps
 61st Rifle Division
 152nd Rifle Division
 25th Breakthrough Artillery Division
 3rd Guards Mortar Brigade
 39th Mortar Brigade
 48th Heavy Mortar Brigade
 175th Light Artillery Brigade
 179th Howitzer Artillery Brigade
 181st Heavy Howitzer Artillery Brigade
 183rd Howitzer Artillery Brigade
 31st Breakthrough Artillery Division
 35th Mortar Brigade
 51st Heavy Mortar Brigade
 191st Howitzer Artillery Brigade
 194th Heavy Howitzer Artillery Brigade
 8th Independent Guards Tank Destroyer Artillery Brigade
 157th Army Canon Artillery Brigade
 71st Anti-aircraft Artillery Division
 36th Engineer Brigade
 3rd Guards Tank Army
 9th Mechanised Corps
 69th Mechanised Brigade
 70th Mechanised Brigade
 71st Mechanised Brigade
 91st Tank Brigade
 6th Guards Tank Corps
 51st Guards Tank Brigade
 52nd Guards Tank Brigade
 53rd Guards Tank Brigade
 22nd Guards Motorised Rifle Brigade
 7th Guards Tank Corps
 54th Guards Tank Brigade
 55th Guards Tank Brigade
 56th Guards Tank Brigade
 23rd Guards Motorised Rifle Brigade
 16th Self-propelled Artillery Brigade
 57th Independent Guards Heavy Tank Regiment
 384th Guards Heavy Tank Regiment
 702nd Self-propelled Artillery Regiment
 1507th Self-propelled Artillery Regiment
 1893rd Self-propelled Artillery Regiment
 1977th Self-propelled Artillery Regiment
 1978th Self-propelled Artillery Regiment
 4th Breakthrough Artillery Division
 30th Guards Mortar Brigade
 37th Mortar Brigade
 49th Heavy Mortar Brigade
 50th Guards Heavy Howitzer Brigade
 163rd Howitzer Artillery Brigade
 168th Light Artillery Brigade
 171st Howitzer Artillery Brigade
 23rd Anti-aircraft Artillery Division
 19th Motorised Engineer Brigade
 4th Guards Tank Army
 10th Guards Tank Corps
 62nd Guards Tank Brigade
 63rd Guards Tank Brigade
 70th Guards Self-propelled Artillery Brigade
 71st Independent Guards Light Artillery Brigade
 6th Guards Anti-aircraft Artillery Division
 2nd Air Army
 2nd Guards Assault Aviation Corps
 5th Guards Assault Aviation Division
 11th Guards Fighter Aviation Division
 6th Guards Bomber Aviation Corps
 1st Guards Bomber Aviation Division
 8th Guards Bomber Aviation Division
 2nd Fighter Aviation Corps
 7th Guards Fighter Aviation Division
 322nd Fighter Aviation Division
 6th Guards Fighter Aviation Corps
 9th Guards Fighter Aviation Division
 23rd Guards Fighter Aviation Division
 219th Bomber Aviation Division
 4th Bomber Aviation Corps
 256th Fighter Aviation Division (parts)
 5th Fighter Aviation Corps
 18th Air Army
 1st Guards Bomber Aviation Corps
 11th Guards Bomber Aviation Division
 16th Guards Bomber Aviation Division
 36th Bomber Aviation Division
 48th Bomber Aviation Division
 2nd Guards Bomber Aviation Corps
 2nd Guards Bomber Aviation Division
 7th Guards Bomber Aviation Division
 13th Guards Bomber Aviation Division
 3rd Guards Bomber Aviation Corps
 1st Guards Bomber Aviation Division
 12th Bomber Aviation Division
 22nd Guards Bomber Aviation Division
 50th Bomber Aviation Division
 14th Bomber Aviation Division
 4th Guards Bomber Aviation Corps
 45th Bomber Aviation Division

Dnieper Flotilla 

 Dnieper Flotilla
 1st River Ship Brigade (parts)

See also
 Order of battle for the Battle of Berlin
 Soviet Air Forces order of battle 1 May 1945

References
 Справочник «Освобождение городов: Справочник по освобождению городов в период Великой Отечественной войны 1941–1945» / М.Л.Дударенко, Ю.Г.Перечнев, В.Т.Елисеев и др. — М.: Воениздат, 1985. — 598 с

World War II orders of battle
Battle of Berlin